David Horsey (born 14 April 1985) is an English professional golfer who currently plays on the European Tour. He has won four events on the tour between 2010 and 2015.

Amateur career
Horsey had a successful amateur career, which included winning the 2005 Greek Amateur Championship and finishing as runner-up in the 2004 English Amateur. He turned professional in 2007 after representing Great Britain and Ireland at the Walker Cup.

Horsey appeared twice as an amateur at the Challenge Tour's Oceânico Developments Pro-Am Challenge, held near his home, finishing in a tie for 13th in 2007.

Professional career
After turning professional in 2007, Horsey played three more events on Europe's development tour, before making his third attempt to win a place on the elite European Tour via qualifying school, but like his previous efforts, he failed to get through to the final stage.

In his first full season on the Challenge Tour in 2008, Horsey recorded two victories, at the Telenet Trophy and the AGF-Allianz EurOpen de Lyon, and seven other top-ten finishes, as he ended the year on top of the rankings to graduate to the European Tour for 2009. During 2008, he also received several invites to full European Tour events, the highlight of which was his début appearance on the tour at the MasterCard Masters, where he finished in a tie for 5th place.

In February 2009, Horsey collected the biggest cheque of his career by posting a final round 64 at the Maybank Malaysian Open to finish as joint runner-up, just one stroke behind winner Anthony Kang. He retained his card for 2010, finishing within the top 100 of the Race to Dubai.

In June 2010, Horsey achieved his first European Tour win at the 2010 BMW International Open. He finished the season ranked 32nd on the Order of Merit.

In April 2011, Horsey won his second European Tour event, the Trophée Hassan II. He defeated Rhys Davies and Jaco van Zyl at the second playoff hole with a birdie 3 while Davies and van Zyl parred. After finishing 7th in the 2011 BMW PGA Championship Horsey reached a career high of 77 in the world rankings.

Amateur wins
2005 Greek Amateur Open Championship

Professional wins (6)

European Tour wins (4)

European Tour playoff record (2–0)

Challenge Tour wins (2)

Results in major championships

CUT = missed the half-way cut
"T" = tied

Results in World Golf Championships

"T" = Tied

Team appearances
Amateur
European Youths' Team Championship (representing England): 2006
European Amateur Team Championship (representing England): 2007
Walker Cup (representing Great Britain & Ireland): 2007

Professional
Seve Trophy (representing Great Britain & Ireland): 2011 (winners)

See also
2008 Challenge Tour graduates
2022 European Tour Qualifying School graduates

References

External links

David Horsey at his management firm's official site

English male golfers
European Tour golfers
Sportspeople from Stockport
People from Wilmslow
1985 births
Living people